Victor Kissine  is a Russian-born classical composer.

Biography
Kissine is a has a PhD in musicology from the Rimsky-Korsakov Saint Petersburg State Conservatory, where he studied under professor , among others.

He has lived in Belgium since 1990 where he is a professor of musical analysis and orchestration at INSAS and at the Royal Conservatory of Mons.

References

External links 

Living people
Russian classical composers
Russian male classical composers
21st-century classical composers
Members of the Royal Academy of Belgium
21st-century Russian male musicians
Year of birth missing (living people)